The Tallensi Traditional Area is a region of northern Ghana, and home to the Tallensi people. It is mainly covered in open savanna. Villages in the area include Gbeogo.

Geography of Ghana